Fergana Region is one of the regions of Uzbekistan, located in the southern part of the Fergana Valley in the far east of the country. It borders the Namangan and Andijan Regions of Uzbekistan, as well as Kyrgyzstan (Batken and Osh Regions) and Tajikistan (Sughd Region). Its capital is the city Fergana. It covers an area of 6,760 km2. The population is approximately 3,896,395 as of 2022, with 44% of the population living in rural areas.

Districts

The Fergana Region consists of 15 districts (listed below) and four district-level cities: Fergana, Kokand, Quvasoy and Margilan.

There are 9 cities (Fergana*, Margilan*,Quvasoy*, Kokand*, Tinchlik, Beshariq, Quva, Rishton, Yaypan) and 197 urban-type settlements in the Fergana Region.

Geography

Fergana Region has a typically continental climate with extreme differences between winter and summer temperatures.

Agriculture is the main economy activity of Fergana Region, primarily irrigated cotton, sericulture, horticulture, and wine. Animal husbandry concentrates on meat and milk production.

Natural resources include deposits of petroleum, ceramic clays, and construction materials.

Industry is primarily based on oil refining, fertilizer and chemical production, textile and silk weaving, light industry, clothing and ceramics. The area is also a center for the production of traditional Uzbek handicrafts, especially pottery.

Passport indicators of Fergana region

(January–June 2020)

II. Socio-economic indicators::

III.            Agricultural indicators:

Fergana region is a region of the Republic of Uzbekistan. It was founded on January 15, 1938. It is located in the east of the republic, in the south of the Fergana valley. Border length (2286.4 km) Of which, in the east with the state of Kyrgyzstan (433.0 km), in the west with the state of Tajikistan (134.6 km), in the north with Andijan (101.6 km), Namangan (79.4 km), regions bordering on. The area is 7.0 thousand sq. km (700 461 ha). The population is 3782.2 thousand people (2020), mainly Uzbeks, but also Tajiks, Russians, Kyrgyz, Tatars and other nationalities. Number of citizens' meetings -1041, number of apartments -756 428. The center of the city is Fergana.

History

The northern part of the Fergana region is occupied by the Karakalpak and Yazyavan steppes, and is bounded on the south by a tributary of the Olay ridge. Fergana region is a high seismic zone. The climate is continental, the winters are mild, sometimes very cold. The average temperature in January is 3.2 C, in July - 28 C. The lowest temperature is 27.9 C. The maximum temperature is 42 C. Strong "Kokand wind" blowing in the west of the valley has a negative impact on the climate. In the south-east it blows summer wind. Annual precipitation ranges from 100 mm in the west (around Kokand) to 170 mm in the east, and up to 270 mm on the mountain slopes, mainly in the spring. Vegetation period is 210–240 days. The Syrdarya River flows along the north-western border of the region. Isfara, Sokh, Shohimardon, Isfayramsay start from the Alay ridge. The rivers are saturated with ice and snow. There are mainly gray soils and meadow-swamp soils, mostly hungry and typical gray soils on the hills, alluvial-meadow soils on the terraces of the Syrdarya, sandy and loamy meadows in the northern part of the region.

Various salt marshes grow in the salt marshes of Central Fergana. There are poplar, mulberry, slate, broad-leaved forests, and pine forests in the oases in the river valleys. In the Syrdarya tugai forests, wolves, foxes, wolverines, rabbits, badgers, and jays are among the wild animals. There are many birds and reptiles. In the water basins there are fish such as marinka, usach, carp, grass carp, perch.

Fergana region is one of the centers of ancient culture of Uzbekistan. Pictures of Stone Age settlements and rocks found in the area, stone tools indicate that people have lived in the valley since ancient times. Excavation of the Greater Fergana Canal has played an important role in the study of archeological monuments of the region. During the canal's excavation, monuments of the Bronze Age, slavery and landownership were found and examined. Finds from the 5th century BC and early Middle Ages in the city of Kuva are well researched. Historical sources from the 10th to the 11th centuries state that this city was the largest city in the valley after Akhsikat in terms of prosperity and size. Archaeological materials prove that the city of Margilan was a large village in the 10th century and took on the appearance of a village in the 11th-12th centuries.

The monuments found in the settlements of the Chust culture, which were engaged in sedentary farming and animal husbandry, are important in the study of the Fergana Valley. Archaeological excavations show that Fergana region has long been inhabited by people, engaged in hunting, farming, animal husbandry, and in the later stages of human society, culture began to develop.

Fergana, which fascinates everyone with its charming nature and unique beauty, has a long history. The reasons for naming this mysterious place "Fergana" are variously described in historical sources.

Scholars have noted that the word "Fergana" was written in the early Middle Ages in the Sogdian script in the forms "Pargana", "Pragana" and in Indo-Sanskrit "small region"; in Persian it means "valley between mountains", "closed valley". It was called "Dovon" in the 2nd century BC, and in the early Middle Ages it was called "Bohan", "Bohanna".

The history of Fergana dates back to the III-II millennium BC. From ancient times the inhabitants of this land have been in close cultural contact with other peoples of the Far East, South and Central Asia. Examples of this are the relics of the "Andronov culture" (III-II millennium BC), which are very common in the region, or the amulet "Two-headed snake" found in Sokh district. The war, labor weapons, household items, and other items of these periods differ from those found in other parts of Central Asia.

With the opening of the Great Silk Road, the influence of Chinese culture on the lives of the peoples of Fergana began to be felt. The emergence of bronze windows, coins, silk fabrics, iron weapons, etc. is directly related to the Great Silk Road. It is precisely because of the Great Silk Road that in the beginning of our era, information about the breeding of horses, camels and small animals, the abundance of precious metals, as well as the cultivation of cotton, grapes and cereals spread around the world. The large number of city-fortress settlements of this period testifies to the development of architecture and urban planning technology.

In the early Middle Ages, Fergana became one of the bridges between Central Asia and China, and the socio-political environment here also changed frequently under the influence of these two regions.

During the reign of the Timurids, national handicrafts, like other industries, developed further. For example, Margilan specialized in the production of silk and silk products, Rishtan in ceramics.

In the beginning of the 18th century, representatives of the Ming dynasty united the villages around the city of Kokand and established a new khanate. Shortly afterward, the Kokand Khanate became one of Central Asia's largest, most powerful, and fastest-growing states.

Fergana, which underwent various turbulent years during the dictatorial regime, finally discovered true beauty during the period of independence and entered a new stage of development. In the words of the first President, he received the status of "Fergana - the pearl of Central Asia."
ilt.

The decree of the First President of the Republic of Uzbekistan dated July 1, 2010 "On the formation of the General Plan of the city of Fergana until 2020" excited all residents of Fergana. Magnificent buildings, trade and service facilities, 5 parks and alleys, 8 fountains, bridges and public roads, built in a combination of national and modern art, have been completed.

Economy

Industry

At present, 38 large industrial enterprises, 7930 small industrial enterprises, 446 joint ventures include the Fergana Oil Refinery, the Azot Production Association, the Quvasoy Quartz Joint-Stock Company, the Eurasian TAPO-Disk, Avtooyna, and DEU Textile joint ventures.

They export oil, cotton, food, canned goods, construction materials, car discs, spare parts, agricultural products, and other products to foreign countries.

Sport

In 1991, there were only 17 stadiums in Fergana region, now there are 46, 759 football fields, 33 modern tennis courts.

In May 2016, the final stage of the Universiade-2016 was held in Fergana.

Education

Today, 946 secondary schools, academic lyceums, 1,870 preschool education institutions, and 20 libraries operate in the region. There are 5 higher education institutions in the region: Fergana State University, Fergana Polytechnic Institute, Kokand State Pedagogical Institute, Tashkent University of Information Technologies Fergana branch, Tashkent Medical Academy Fergana branch, Kokand University and Kokand state technical university.

Healthcare

There are 839 healthcare facilities in the region.

Literature

From the 18th century onwards, science, literature, and art flourished in the Fergana Valley, particularly in Kokand. The formation of the Kokand khanate and its functioning as a centralized state allowed the formation of a unique literary environment in the territory of the khanate. During this period, such literary figures as Huvaydo, Shokhi, Akmal, Nizami, Hoqandi created.

In the 19th century, the literature known as the "Kokand Literary Environment" flourished in the region. The organizer of this environment, Kokand khan Muhammad Said Amir Umarkhan (1787-1822) attracted about 100 artists to the palace and created material and spiritual conditions for their creativity. The khan himself wrote the "Devoni" of poems under the pseudonym Amir.

It is known from history that Fergana was the birthplace of great scholars, like Ahmad Fergani, Burhaniddin Marginoni, poets and poetesses such as Muqimi, Furkat, Nodira, Uvaysi, and a number of scientists. During the years of independence, the rich spiritual heritage left by these authors has been completely rediscovered, boosting spiritual and cultural life.

Fergana literature, which is an integral part of Uzbek literature, flourished, especially during the years of independence. People's poets of Uzbekistan such as Ohunjon Hakimov, Anvar Obidjon, Ikbol Mirzo, Enakhon Siddikova, M. Ergasheva, Yuldosh Solijonov, Khudoiberdi Tukhtaboev, I. Mahmud, Bahodir Isa, Siddik Momin are constantly shaking the pen and creating images of our contemporaries in their works.

Academicians from Fergana

Honored Scientist of Uzbekistan, Academician of the Academy of Sciences of Uzbekistan, Doctor of Physical and Mathematical Sciences, Professor, First President of the Academy of Sciences of Uzbekistan, Hero of Labor, teacher, public figure - Qori-Niyazi Tashmuhammad Niyazovich.

Literary scholar, poet, corresponding member of the Academy of Sciences of Uzbekistan - Baki (pseudonym; real name Mirzaabdulla Nasriddinov).

Historian, orientalist, academician of the Academy of Sciences of Uzbekistan - Yuldashev Muhammadjon Yuldashevich.

Physicist, statesman and public figure, Academician of the Academy of Sciences of Uzbekistan, Honored Worker of Science and Technology of Uzbekistan, Doctor of Physical and Mathematical Sciences, Professor - Ubay Orifov.

Hydrobiologist, Academician of the Academy of Sciences of Uzbekistan, Honored Scientist of Uzbekistan, Doctor of Biological Sciences, Professor - Muhammadiev Avliyokhon.

One of the organizers of zoology in Uzbekistan, Academician of the Academy of Sciences of Uzbekistan, Honored Scientist and Technician of Uzbekistan, Doctor of Biological Sciences, Professor - Zohidov Tesha Zohidovich.

Economist, Corresponding Member of the Academy of Sciences of Uzbekistan, Doctor of Economics, Professor, Honored Scientist of Uzbekistan - Aminov Olim Muminovich.

Botanist, Academician of the Academy of Sciences of Uzbekistan, Honored Scientist of Uzbekistan, Doctor of Biological Sciences, Professor - Saidov Jura.

Genetic scientist, corresponding member of the Academy of Sciences of Uzbekistan, Honored Scientist of Uzbekistan - Sodikov Saodat Sodikovich.

Infectious disease scientist, academician of the Academy of Sciences of Uzbekistan, Honored Worker of Science and Technology of Uzbekistan and Karakalpakstan, Honored Doctor of Uzbekistan, participant of the Second World War - Musaboev Ishak Kurbanovich.

Linguist, corresponding member of the Academy of Sciences of Uzbekistan, candidate of philological sciences - Kamilova Hosiyat Kamilovna.

Agronomist, statesman, Academician of the Academy of Sciences of Uzbekistan, Honored Scientist of Uzbekistan, Doctor of Agricultural Sciences, Professor - Muhammadjanov Mirzaali Valievich.

Theater scholar, Academician of the Academy of Sciences of Uzbekistan, Honored Scientist of Uzbekistan, Doctor of Arts, Professor - Rakhmonov Mamajon.

Mathematician and public figure, Academician of the Academy of Sciences of Uzbekistan, Honored Scientist of Uzbekistan, Doctor of Physics and Mathematics, Professor - Sirojiddinov Sadi Hasanovich.

Linguist, Academician of the Academy of Sciences of Uzbekistan, Honored Scientist of Uzbekistan - Abdurahmanov Ganijon.

Historian, Academician of the Academy of Sciences of Uzbekistan, Honored Scientist of Uzbekistan, Doctor of Historical Sciences, Professor - Aminova Rahima Hodievna.

Literary critic, academician of the Academy of Sciences of Uzbekistan, Honored Scientist of Uzbekistan, Doctor of Philology - Kayumov Azizkhon Pulatovich.

Literary scholar, Honored Scientist of Uzbekistan, Doctor of Philology, Professor - Hayitmetov Abdukodir Khojimetovich.

Master of painting, academician of the Academy of Sciences of Uzbekistan, People's Artist of Uzbekistan - Kuzibaev Nemat Mirzaboevich.

Philosopher, Academician of the Academy of Sciences of Uzbekistan, Honored Scientist of Uzbekistan, Corresponding Member of the Russian Academy of Sciences, Doctor of Philosophy, Professor - Yusupov Erkin.

Philosopher, Academician of the Academy of Sciences of Uzbekistan, Honored Scientist of Uzbekistan, Honored Scientist of Karakalpakstan, Doctor of Philosophy, Professor - Khairullaev Muzaffar Muhitdinovich.

Mathematical scientist, academician of the Academy of Sciences of Uzbekistan, doctor of physical and mathematical sciences, professor - Farmonov Shokir Kasimovich.

Master of painting, academician of the Academy of Sciences of Uzbekistan - Tursunnazarov Yigitali.

Orientalist, source scientist, public figure, academician of the Academy of Sciences of Uzbekistan, Honored Scientist of Uzbekistan, Doctor of Philology, Professor - Ibrahimov Nematulla.

Potter, successor of the dynasty, a great representative of the modern Rishtan school of pottery, academician of the Academy of Arts of Uzbekistan, Honored Worker of Culture of Uzbekistan - Yusupov Sharofiddin Isomiddinovich.

The head of the Sado enterprise, academician of the Academy of Arts of Uzbekistan Rahmonali Nortojiev.

"People's Artist of Uzbekistan", Academician of the Academy of Arts of Uzbekistan - Sultanali Mannopov.

Historical monuments

Research on shrines helps to shed light on the historical foundations, ways of development and traditions of the culture of the Uzbek people.

Arki Oliy (Orda) shrine-step

"Dahmai shohon" is the burial palace of the Kokand khans

Sister cities
 Yongin, South Korea (2008)

References

 
Regions of Uzbekistan